John "Jack" Rickards (12 October 1928 – 6 May 1986) was a Zimbabwean sports shooter. He competed for Rhodesia in the trap event at the 1964 Summer Olympics.

References

External links
 

1928 births
1986 deaths
Zimbabwean male sport shooters
Olympic shooters of Rhodesia
Shooters at the 1964 Summer Olympics
Place of birth missing